Simon Wilson (born 3 September 1970) is a New Zealand cricketer. He played in 33 first-class and 29 List A matches for Canterbury and Central Districts from 1990 to 1995.

References

External links
 

1970 births
Living people
New Zealand cricketers
Canterbury cricketers
Central Districts cricketers
Cricketers from Blenheim, New Zealand